John Székely de Szentgyörgy (died 18 October 1448) was a Hungarian baron, who served as ban of Croatia, Dalmatia and Slavonia between June 1446 and January 1448. He was a brother-in-law of regent John Hunyadi. His son Thomas Székely was prior of Vrana.

His name was first mentioned by historical sources in 1429. He was a familiar of John Hunyadi and served as juror for Solt in 1429. He functioned as judge of the Cumans from 1444 to 1446. After that he was appointed ban and besides that he was also gubernator of the Priory of Vrana. He supported his brother-in-law against the Counts of Celje in the civil war, as a result the nobles of Varaždin and Zagreb Counties complained against him in the Diet of 1447. John Székely was killed in the Battle of Kosovo in 1448.

References

Sources
  Engel, Pál (1996). Magyarország világi archontológiája, 1301–1457, I. ("Secular Archontology of Hungary, 1301–1457, Volume I"). História, MTA Történettudományi Intézete. Budapest. .
  Markó, László (2006). A magyar állam főméltóságai Szent Istvántól napjainkig: Életrajzi Lexikon ("Great Officers of State in Hungary from King Saint Stephen to Our Days: A Biographical Encyclopedia"). 2nd edition, Helikon Kiadó. 

1448 deaths
Hungarian soldiers
15th-century Hungarian people
Bans of Croatia
Hunyadi family
Year of birth unknown